Blum Creek is a small glacial tributary of the Baker River in Washington state, in the United States. Hagan Glacier is located below Mount Blum and the creek is also fed by runoff from the Blum Lakes, a set of six lakes south of Bacon Peak. The creek joins the Baker River two drainages downstream of Sulphide Creek, another Baker River glacial tributary. Blum Creek forms the waterfall Blum Basin Falls as it tumbles down a  glacial cliff. The creek's watershed is an overwintering location for the local Rocky mountain goats (Oreamnos americanus).

See also
List of rivers of Washington

External links

References

Rivers of Washington (state)
North Cascades of Washington (state)
Rivers of Whatcom County, Washington